The 46th parallel north is a circle of latitude that is 46 degrees north of the Earth's equatorial plane. It crosses Europe, Asia, the Pacific Ocean, North America, and the Atlantic Ocean.

At this latitude the sun is visible for 15 hours, 45 minutes during the summer solstice and 8 hours, 38 minutes during the winter solstice.

Around the world
Starting at the Prime Meridian and heading eastwards, the parallel 46° north passes through:

{| class="wikitable plainrowheaders"
! scope="col" width="125" | Co-ordinates
! scope="col" | Country, territory or sea
! scope="col" | Notes
|-
| 
! scope="row" | 
|
|-
| 
! scope="row" | 
|
|-
| 
! scope="row" | 
| Passing through Lake Maggiore near Luino 
|-
| 
! scope="row" | 
| Passing through Lake Lugano
|-
| 
! scope="row" | 
| Passing through Lake Como
|-
| 
! scope="row" | 
| Passing just south of Ljubljana
|-
| 
! scope="row" | 
|
|-
| 
! scope="row" | 
|   
|-
| 
! scope="row" | 
| For about 7 km
|-
| 
! scope="row" | 
| For about 4 km
|-
| 
! scope="row" | 
| For about 2 km
|-
| 
! scope="row" | 
|  For about 5 km
|-
| 
! scope="row" | 
| passing just south of Subotica
|-
| 
! scope="row" | 
|
|-
| 
! scope="row" | 
|  
|-
| 
! scope="row" | 
| Odessa Oblast — passing just south of Bilhorod-Dnistrovskyi
|-
| style="background:#b0e0e6;" | 
! scope="row" style="background:#b0e0e6;" | Black Sea
| style="background:#b0e0e6;" |
|-
| 
! scope="row" | 
| Crimea (claimed and controlled by ) — passing just south of ArmianskKherson Oblast — passing through Chonhar peninsula and Arabat Spit
|-
| style="background:#b0e0e6;" | 
! scope="row" style="background:#b0e0e6;" | Sea of Azov
| style="background:#b0e0e6;" |
|-
| 
! scope="row" | 
|
|-
| style="background:#b0e0e6;" | 
! scope="row" style="background:#b0e0e6;" | Caspian Sea
| style="background:#b0e0e6;" |
|-
| 
! scope="row" | 
| Passing through the Aral Sea and Lake Balkhash
|-
| 
! scope="row" | 
| Xinjiang
|-
| 
! scope="row" | 
|
|-valign="top"
| 
! scope="row" | 
| Inner Mongolia Jilin - for about 7 km Inner Mongolia Jilin Heilongjiang — passing about 30 km north of Harbin
|-
| 
! scope="row" | 
| Primorsky Krai
|-
| style="background:#b0e0e6;" | 
! scope="row" style="background:#b0e0e6;" | Sea of Japan
| style="background:#b0e0e6;" |
|-
| 
! scope="row" | 
| Sakhalin island
|-
| style="background:#b0e0e6;" | 
! scope="row" style="background:#b0e0e6;" | Sea of Okhotsk
| style="background:#b0e0e6;" |
|-
| 
! scope="row" | 
| Island of Urup, Kuril Islands 
|-
| style="background:#b0e0e6;" | 
! scope="row" style="background:#b0e0e6;" | Pacific Ocean
| style="background:#b0e0e6;" |
|-valign="top"
| 
! scope="row" | 
| Oregon Washington Washington/Oregon border Idaho Montana - passing through Butte North Dakota/South Dakota border Minnesota Wisconsin Michigan
|-
| style="background:#b0e0e6;" | 
! scope="row" style="background:#b0e0e6;" | Lake Michigan
| style="background:#b0e0e6;" |
|-valign="top"
| 
! scope="row" | 
| Michigan - Upper Peninsula and Drummond Island
|-
| style="background:#b0e0e6;" | 
! scope="row" style="background:#b0e0e6;" | Lake Huron
| style="background:#b0e0e6;" | North Channel - passing just north of Cockburn Island and Manitoulin Island, Ontario, 
|-valign="top"
| 
! scope="row" | 
| Ontario Quebec - passing just south of Sorel-Tracy
|-
| 
! scope="row" | 
| Maine
|-valign="top"
| 
! scope="row" | 
| New Brunswick - passing just north of Fredericton Nova Scotia (for about 2 km)
|-
| style="background:#b0e0e6;" | 
! scope="row" style="background:#b0e0e6;" | Northumberland Strait
| style="background:#b0e0e6;" |
|-
| 
! scope="row" | 
| Prince Edward Island
|-
| style="background:#b0e0e6;" | 
! scope="row" style="background:#b0e0e6;" | Northumberland Strait
| style="background:#b0e0e6;" |
|-
| 
! scope="row" | 
| Nova Scotia - Cape Breton Island
|-
| style="background:#b0e0e6;" | 
! scope="row" style="background:#b0e0e6;" | Atlantic Ocean
| style="background:#b0e0e6;" |
|-
| 
! scope="row" | 
| Île d'Oléron and the mainland
|-
|}

See also
45th parallel north
47th parallel north

References

n46